Rugetu may refer to several villages in Romania:

 Rugetu, a village in Mihăeşti Commune, Vâlcea County
 Rugetu, a village in Slătioara Commune, Vâlcea County